Nuño Alfonso (1112–1136) was a medieval Galician bishop.

References 
 Episcopologio Mindoniense. CAL PARDO, Enrique, 2003, .

External links 
  Official web site of the Diocese of Mondoñedo-Ferrol

Clergy from Galicia (Spain)
12th-century Roman Catholic bishops in Spain
1112 births
1136 deaths